Country is a 1984 American drama film which follows the trials and tribulations of a rural family as they struggle to hold on to their farm during the trying economic times experienced by family farms in 1980s America. The film was written by William D. Wittliff, and stars real-life couple Jessica Lange and Sam Shepard. The film was directed by Richard Pearce, and was shot on location in Dunkerton and Readlyn Iowa, and at Burbank's Walt Disney Studios.

Lange, who also co-produced the film, was nominated for an Academy Award for Best Actress and a Golden Globe award for her role.

Then-U.S. president Ronald Reagan stated in his personal diary that this film "was a blatant propaganda message against our agri programs". Some members of the U.S. Congress took the film so seriously that Jessica Lange was brought before a congressional panel to testify as an expert about living on family farms.

Country was one of three 1984 films, along with The River and Places in the Heart, that dealt with the perspective of family farm life "struggles."

Plot

Gilbert "Gil" Ivy (Sam Shepard) and his wife Jewell (Jessica Lange) have worked Jewell's family farm for years, and her father Otis (Wilford Brimley) does not want to see his family farm lost to foreclosure. However, low crop prices, interest on FHA loans, pressure by the FHA to reduce both the loan and operating expenditure, and a tornado all put pressure on the struggling family as they face hardship and the prospect of losing their home and livelihood.

Cast
Jessica Lange as Jewell Ivy 
Sam Shepard as Gilbert "Gil" Ivy
Wilford Brimley as Otis
Matt Clark as Tom McMullen
Therese Graham as Marlene Ivy
Levi L. Knebel as Carlisle Ivy
Jim Haynie as Arlon Brewer
Sandra Seacat as Louise Brewer
Alex Harvey as Fordyce
Stephanie Stacie-Poyner as Missy Ivy

References

External links 
 
 
 

1984 films
Touchstone Pictures films
Films directed by Richard Pearce
1984 drama films
American drama films
Films about agriculture
Films set on farms
1980s English-language films
1980s American films